Irianmenes is a monotypic Australasian genus of potter wasps which was described in 1943 by the Italian entomologist Antonio Giordani Soika from specimens taken in Irian Jaya. The sole species is Irianmenes schneideri.

References

Monotypic Hymenoptera genera
Potter wasps